The Hits Collection is a compilation album by Kim Wilde. The album was released on March 6, 2006. Originally the album was intended to be a repackaged version of the 1996 compilation Best of Kim Wilde. When the album was announced, the webmaster of Wilde's fansite contacted EMI and asked if it would be a better idea to release a new compilation of Wilde's EMI 'first' years of 1981-1983 instead. EMI agreed, and so this compilation came to be.

This compilation assembles the first eight 7" A-sides of Wilde's career (tracks 1 through 8) as well as their respective B-sides (tracks 9 through 16), in chronological order. Versions included on the original singles had been the album versions, except "Water on Glass" which was remixed, and "Love Blonde" which was edited. Those two single versions appear here. "Can You Hear It" is not the original 7" version though, but the reworked album version.

Also included is the 1982 Japan-only A-side "Bitter Is Better", unreleased in the UK until this CD. The last two tracks are the two extended versions (12" A-sides) released in the time frame.

Track listing

Charts

References

External links

2006 greatest hits albums
Kim Wilde compilation albums